Swimming has been a sport at every modern Summer Olympics. It has been open to women since 1912. At the Olympics, swimming has the second-highest number of medal-contested events (after athletics).

Summary

Long-course swimming

Men's events

Women's events

Mixed events

Medal table
Last updated after the 2020 Summer Olympics

Marathon swimming

Events

Medal table
Last updated after the 2020 Summer Olympics

Overall medal table

Last updated after the 2020 Summer Olympics

Nations

Olympic records 

The International Olympic Committee recognize the best performances in all 35 current swimming events at the Games as Olympic records.

Notable changes to the sport
Times have consistently dropped over the years due to better training techniques and new developments within the sport.

In the first four Olympics, competitions were not held in pools, but rather in open water (1896, the Mediterranean Sea; 1900, the Seine; 1904, an artificial lake; 1906, the Mediterranean). The 1904 Olympics' races were the only ones ever measured in yards, instead of the usual metres. A 100-metre pool was built for the 1908 Olympics and was located in the centre of the main stadium's track and field oval. The 1912 Olympics, held in the Stockholm harbor, marked the beginning of electrical timing.

Male swimmers wore full body swimsuits up until the 1940s, which caused more drag in the water than their modern swim-wear counterparts. Also, over the years, pool designs have lessened the drag. Some design considerations allow for the reduction of swimming resistance making the pool faster. Namely, proper pool depth, elimination of waves, elimination of currents, increased lane width, energy absorbing racing lane lines and gutters, and the use of other innovative hydraulic, acoustic, illumination, and swimwear designs.

The 1924 Olympics were the first to use the standard 50-metre pool with marked lanes (a standard the that remains to this day). In the freestyle, swimmers originally dove from the pool walls, but diving blocks were first incorporated at the 1936 Summer Olympics. The flip-turn was developed by the 1950s. Swimming goggles were first allowed in 1976.

The butterfly stroke events were not held until 1956. Previous rules permitted the butterfly stroke in breaststroke races. After 1956, when these rules were changed, butterfly became its own stroke entirely.

The 800m event was added to the women’s programme in 1968; whilst longer this event was not as far as the men’s 1,500m event. This discrepancy was evened out in 2020: that year, the 1,500 metres was included in the women’s programme in for the first time. The 800 metres freestyle was added to the men’s programme the same year.

Both men and women were granted the 200 metres freestyle race in 1968, giving swimmers an intermediate distance race between 100 metres and 400 metres.

The women's 4 × 200 metres freestyle relay race was added in 1996—a men's relay race at that distance had been held since 1912; interestingly, the winning time for the women's 4 × 200 metres freestyle relay in 1996 was more than two minutes faster than the men's 4 × 200 metres freestyle relay of 1912. At six Games, the men had two freestyle relay races, while the women had one. Starting with 1996, both genders have two.

The medley relay races (4 × 100 metres) were not held for men or for women until 1960, but they have continued in every Games since then. The mixed 4 × 100 metres relay was added to the programme in 2020.  

Starting in 2008, both men and women compete in 10 km open water marathon swim events.

Notes

See also
List of Olympic medalists in swimming (men)
List of Olympic medalists in swimming (women)
List of Olympic venues in swimming
Major achievements in swimming by nation
Swimming at the Summer Paralympics

References
 International Olympic Committee results database

External links
 Swim Rankings results

 
Olympic Games
Sports at the Summer Olympics